Bamut (Bummat) is a rural locality (a selo) in Sernovodsky District, Chechnya.

Administrative and municipal status 
Municipally, Bamut is incorporated as Bamutskoye rural settlement. It is the administrative center of the municipality and is the only settlement included in it.

Geography 

Bamut is located on both banks of the Fortanga River.

The nearest settlements to Bamut are Katyr-Yurt in the east, Shalazhi, Stary Achkhoy and Yandi in the south-east, Arshty in the south-west, Nesterovskaya in the north-west, and Assinovskaya and Novy Sharoy in the north.

History 
From 1922 to 1934, Bamut was a part of the Ingush Autonomous Oblast.

In 1944, after the genocide and deportation of the Chechen and Ingush people and the Chechen-Ingush ASSR was abolished, the village of Bamut was renamed to Bukovka, and settled by people from the neighboring republic of Dagestan. From 1944 to 1957, it was a part of the Vedensky District of the Dagestan ASSR.

In 1958, after the Vaynakh people returned and the Chechen-Ingush ASSR was restored, the village regained its old Chechen name, Bummat.

During the First Chechen War, the infamous Battle of Bamut occurred in the village.

At the start of the Second Chechen War, in the fall of 1999, the territory of Bamut was completely closed to civilians. The settlement was only unblocked again in April 2002.

In the fall of 2014, by decree of the leadership of the Chechen Republic, a large-scale restoration of the village, which was completely destroyed, was launched. The opening of the revived village of Bamut took place on 3 December 2014.

On 8 September 2019, a referendum was held in Bamut on the transfer of the settlement to the Chechen section of Sunzhensky District. According to the official results, 1,565 people (73.61% of residents of Bamut) took part in the referendum, in which 84.98% of people voted in favor of the transfer, and 14.82% of people voted against it.

Population 
 1990 Census: 5,858
 2002 Census: 5,137
 2010 Census: 6,025
 2019 estimate: 5,589

According to the results of the 2010 Census, the majority of residents of Bamut (6,013 or 99.80%) were ethnic Chechens, with 12 people (0.20%) coming from other ethnic backgrounds.

According to the 2002 Census, 5,137 people (2,465 men and 2,672 women) lived in Bamut.

References 

Rural localities in Sernovodsky District